Crash (born John Matos; October 11, 1961 in Bronx, New York) is a graffiti artist.

Early life
As early as 13, John Matos was spray painting New York City trains, the full image art as opposed to simpler tagging soon transferred to silk screened canvas.

Recognition
Crash was first noticed through his murals on subway cars and dilapidated buildings and is now regarded as a pioneer of the Graffiti art movement.

His work is said to convey a "visual link between street life and established society". and in 1980, Crash curated the now iconic exhibition:"Graffiti Art Success for America" at Fashion MODA, launching the graffiti movement that has remained very active through today.

During the 1980s, Crash had exhibits across the United States and abroad. Galerie Yaki Kornblit was the first instrumental gallery in Amsterdam that helped launch his career in Europe.  In 1981, Crash, along with 10 other artists were chosen by The Public Art Fund to design animated imagery for The Spectacolor Billboard in Times Square.

In 1983, Crash was given his first gallery showing by Sidney Janis at the Sidney Janis Gallery, Chase Manhattan, N.A., as well as CITIBANK, N.A., and other collections came calling.

In 1988, he sprayed Notes in the Wind measuring 178 x 178 centimeters to be exhibited and eventually to be owned by the Peter Stuyvesant Foundation in Zevenaar, Netherlands.

Eric Clapton Graffiti Guitars
In 1996, Crash painted an Eric Clapton Signature Stratocaster and gave it to the artist as a gift. Clapton went on to use the specially designed guitar through his 2001 tour and later appeared with another. In total Crash has created 5 guitars for Clapton, though only three of them have made public appearances. One of Clapton's "Crashocasters" (nicknamed by Eric's former guitar tech, Lee Dickson) auctioned for $321,100 (USD) by the name of "Crash-3" and was used extensively during the first Crossroads Guitar Festival in 2004. Soon after Fender Musical Instruments commissioned the creation of 50 such graffiti designed guitars from Crash and named the line "Crashocasters." Crash went on to also design a line of custom painted Telecasters with matching Fender amps. Other artists such as John Mayer and Ed Sheeran have used the custom painted Crashocaster guitars. Crash painted another Crashocaster which Clapton played at the Crossroads Guitar Festival 2019 held at American Airlines Center of Dallas (Texas) on September 20th and 21st, 2019.

Crash x Teddy M Stratocaster for Ed Sheeran
In 2015, musician Ed Sheeran commissioned a collaboration between Crash and British artist Teddy M to create the 'Crash x Teddy M' Stratocaster.  The guitar features Crash's famous eye design and the Teddy M Heart and was debuted by Sheeran during his sold out Wembley Stadium, London shows in July 2015.

Keith Haring Collaborations
In 1984, Crash along with Keith Haring painted mural installations for the 5/5 Figuration Libre France/USA at the Musée d'art Moderne de la Ville de Paris and in 1995, Crash was commissioned by British American Tobacco to create a commission for Lucky Strike brand cigarette, joining fellow artist Keith Haring to create a special work for this company and their collection.

Notable Exhibitions
In July 2006, the pieces titled "Aeroplane 1" (1983) and "A-U-T-O-matic",(1985), along with other paintings from their permanent collection were displayed in the Brooklyn Museum of Art in a featured exhibit titled "Graffiti."
In 2009, Crash held his first exhibition of painted guitars and guitar related artwork in NYC.

In 2016, a new series of canvas spray paintings were displayed at JoAnne Artman Gallery in Chelsea for his solo exhibition entitled, "Breaking Ground: Redefining the Urban Experience." In 2018, Crash showed at JoAnne Artman Gallery again for another show, "Concrete Jungle."

30 Year Retrospective
In 2010, Crash held a 30-year retrospective at Fairfield University's Walsh Gallery.
Crash was asked by Sanrio to create a series of paintings to be shown at Art Basel, Miami Beach, FL, featuring Hello Kitty and other characters from Sanrio's catalogue.

Notable Projects
Also, in 2010, Crash was commissioned to create a special limited edition luggage for TUMI, Inc.  A painting was created and used for the design, which was released worldwide in 2011.  Same day releases were coordinated in Tokyo, Hong Kong, New York, Germany, Paris and London.
Crash is one of the New York artist featured at MOCA, The David Geffen Building, Los Angeles' "Art in the Streets", April–August 2011.

In 2011, Crash held his first print survey exhibition in Southport, Ct., at Southport Galleries.

In 2012, Crash was asked to participate in painting on Paris' Le M.U.R.

In 2014, Crash was asked to create a series of murals for The Little Italy Street Art ( L.I.S.A. ) Project as well for T.A.G.
Project, The Bronx, NY.  He was also asked to participate on painting at The Bushwick Collective, Brooklyn, NY.
Crash also created a line of shoe wear for ASH Footwear.
In 2014, Crash along with partner Robert Kantor, opened WALLWORKSNY, in the South Bronx, to showcase both young, emerging local artists as well as established artist both local and international.

In 2015, Crash continued his long standing association with the TATSCRU by painting a series of murals, as well with The L.I.S.A. Project.
Also in 2015, he was commissioned to participate and install a mural in Coney Island for Coney Art Walls in cooperation with Thor Equities and Jeffrey Deitch, Brooklyn, NY. He created a site specific mural at Villa Tamaris, La Seyne sur Mer, France, as wall as a retrospective exhibition of his work, spanning 30 years.
The end of 2015 found Crash creating his last installation for the year at Wynwood Walls, Wynwood, Miami for Goldman Properties.

In 2016, Crash was commissioned to create a 200-foot mural at the new wing of The Jewish General Hospital in Montreal, Canada, as well as accepting a mural commission at Sun Life Stadium, Miami, Florida, and new installations for The L.I.S.A. Project and a new mural for Coney Art Walls in cooperation with Thor Equities and Jeffrey Deitch, Brooklyn, NY. (Houston/Bowery Wall, NYC)

In 2019, Crash participated in the New York City's "Beyond the Streets," bringing a massive new showcase of the evolution of graffiti and street art to the city that helped it become a global phenomenon.

Public Collections 
Boca Raton Museum of Art
Museum of Modern Art, NYC
Brooklyn Museum, Brooklyn, NY
New Orleans Museum of Art, New Orleans, LA
Scottsdale Museum of Contemporary Art, AZ
Museum of the City of New York, NYC
Flint Institute, Flint, MI
Groniger Museum, Groningen, The Netherlands
Museum Boymans-van Beuninger, Rotterdam, The Netherlands
Aachen, Nue Galerie-Sammlung Ludwig, Germany
Stedelijk Museum, Amsterdam, The Netherlands
Ft. Wayne Museum, Ft. Wayne, Indiana
Cedar Rapids Museum, Cedar Rapids, Iowa
Vero Beach Museum, Vero Beach, FL
Vieques Museum, Vieques, Puerto Rico
Naples Museum of Art, Naples, FL
Orlando Museum of Art, Orlando, FL

References

External links
Crash Homepage
Crash Journal -  Pad
Crash - Blog
Crashocasters
An interview with John Matos
 Exhibition in Addict Galerie, Paris, 2010

1961 births
Living people
American graffiti artists
People from the Bronx
Artists from the Bronx